Trasancos or Trasanquos was the name of a historic Galician county in northern Galicia. The Transanqui was a Gallaeci people in Pre-Roman and Roman times, and it is documented as county since the 6th century in the Suebic Kingdom of Galicia until the 20th century.

Kingdom of the Suebi